Nicola Lagnena (born 25 November 1986, in Torre del Greco) is an Italian football defender who plays for S.S. Cavese 1919.

Caps on Italian Series 

Serie C2: 32 Caps, 1 Goal

Serie D: 79 Caps, 1 Goal

Total: 111 Caps, 1 Goal

See also
Football in Italy
List of football clubs in Italy

References

External links
http://aic.football.it/scheda/20234/lagnena-nicola.htm

Italian footballers
1986 births
Living people
Association football defenders
U.S. Savoia 1908 players